John William Cunliffe (January 20, 1865 - 1946) was a scholar and author. He was a professor and English department chairman at Columbia University and also directed the school's journalism department. He was born in England.

Career
Cunliffe was one of the contributing editors to the Library of the World's Best Literature. He coauthored an introduction to one of the revised, updated, and expanded editions. He was succeeded at Columbia by Carl W. Ackerman.

In March 1928, Columbia University Press announced a plan to publish a survey of literature chaired by Cunliffe. Columbia University has a collection of English department correspondence that includes Cunliffe.

Bibliography
Poems of the Great War by John William Cunliffe, The Macmillan Company, 1916 on behalf of the Belgian scholarship committee 
Leaders of the Victorian revolution (1934) by John William Cunliffe
The influence of Seneca on Elizabethan tragedy (1893) by John William Cunliffe
English literature during the last half-century (1919) by John William Cunliffe, a collection of essays
English literature in the twentieth century (1933) by John William Cunliffe
The complete works of George Gascoigne (1907) by George Gascoigne edited by John William Cunliffe
Modern English playwrights; a short history of the English drama from 1825 (1927) by John William Cunliffe
The Columbia University Course in Literature : Writers of Modern America, John W. Cunliffe (Chairman), Columbia University Press, New York, 1929
Early English classical tragedies (1912) by John William Cunliffe
Century readings for a course in English literature (1910) by John William Cunliffe
Writing of Today : Models of Journalistic Prose by John William Cunliffe
College English Composition (article)

References

1865 births
1946 deaths
Columbia University faculty
English literary historians
English non-fiction writers
British expatriate academics in the United States
English male non-fiction writers
English literary critics